İlker Kızmaz (born 9 September 1975) is a Turkish actor.

Early life 
İlker Kızmaz was born and raised in İzmir. As he became interested in acting, he started appearing on stage in his hometown. He later graduated from Anadolu University School of Communication. In 2004, he  moved to Istanbul and began his education in acting at the Ekol Drama Art House and later enrolled in Bahçeşehir University, where he took acting courses.

Career 
Kızmaz made his television debut in 2002 by appearing in minor roles in the TV series Aslı ile Kerem, Yeter Anne and Candan Öte. He also took part in a number of commercials during those years. Between 2008–2010, he portrayed the character of Nihat Önal on Kanal D drama series Aşk-ı Memnu. The series was both a national and international success and marked the breakthrough his career.

In 2009, he made his cinematic debut with a role in the movie Nefes: Vatan Sağolsun, directed by Levent Semerci. The movie won various national awards.

In 2012, he had a leading role in the historical drama movie Çanakkale 1915, in which he portrayed the character of Yarbay Mustafa Kemal. In 2014, he joined the cast of TRT 1 series Yedi Güzel Adam, playing the role of Kenan. In the same year, he shared the leading role with Mete Horozoğlu, Ayça Bingöl and Ekin Koç on the TV series Benim Adım Gültepe.

Personal life 
Kızmaz married Aslı Türkel, his costar from Nefes: Vatan Sağolsun, on 16 June 2014. Their daughter, Naz, was born in June 2016.

Filmography

References

External links 
 
 

Turkish male film actors
Turkish male television actors
Turkish male stage actors
1975 births
Living people